The botet is a small instrument or bird call used in the Catalan region of Spain. It is used for calling quails into a trap, and made of a rabbit or pigeon bone.

Images

References

Catalan musical instruments
Quails
Woodwind instruments